The 1990 United States Senate election in Mississippi was held on November 6, 1990. Incumbent Republican U.S. Senator Thad Cochran won re-election to a third term. The Democratic Party did not field a candidate for this election.

Candidates

Republican 
 Thad Cochran, incumbent U.S. Senator

Results

See also 
 1990 United States Senate elections

References 

Mississippi
1990
1990 Mississippi elections